Irving Carrie Taylor (August 13, 1919 – December 4, 1991) was a Canadian ice hockey player. He was a member of the Ottawa RCAF Flyers who won the gold medal in ice hockey for Canada at the 1948 Winter Olympics in St. Moritz. Taylor died after complications due to stomach cancer at his home in Ottawa, Ontario, Canada.

References

External links
bio
Team profile

1919 births
1991 deaths
Ice hockey players at the 1948 Winter Olympics
Medalists at the 1948 Winter Olympics
Olympic gold medalists for Canada
Olympic ice hockey players of Canada
Olympic medalists in ice hockey